Darvish Khak-e Pain (also Romanized as Darvīsh Khāk-e Pā’īn; also known as Pā’īn Darvīsh Khāk) is a village in Esbu Kola Rural District, in the Central District of Babol County, Mazandaran Province, Iran. At the 2006 census, its population was 354, in 93 families.

References 

Populated places in Babol County